Irina Kotova (born November 17, 1976 in Minsk) is a Belarusian-French painter and graphic artist.

Biography 
Irina Kotova was born in Minsk (Belarus), November 17, 1976.
She studied in Belarusian State Academy of Arts from 1996 to 2002, got a Diploma of Graphic Art Department. 
She entered St. Sergius Orthodox Theological Institute in Paris in 2003, got a Diploma of Theology Licence in 2007.
She studied in the École pratique des hautes études (EPHE) in Paris from 2007 to 2009, got a Diploma in the History of Art, Master. Irina Kotova is a participant of International and Republican exhibitions, her works are kept in National Art Museum of the Republic of Belarus, Belarusian Embassy in Paris and private collections in Belarus, Russia,  France, Italy, Spain, Canada, the USA.

Exhibitions

Personal exhibitions 
 2005 with the support of the Orthodox Church in America (OCA), Charleston (South Carolina), U.S.A.
 2006 Belarusian Embassy in France, Paris
 2010-2011 National Art Museum of the Republic of Belarus, Minsk
 2011 Belarusian State Academy of Arts, Minsk
 2012 Russian Centre of Science and Culture in Paris
 2013-2014: Orthodoxie.com gallery  in Paris, "From the Incarnation to the Resurrection".
 2018 Belarusian Embassy in France, Paris
 2018 Honorary Consulate of the Republic of Belarus in France, Biarritz

Duo exhibition
2013-2014: Russkiy Mir gallery in Paris, "The Wings of Christmas".

Group exhibitions
 1995/1996  two International Exhibitions, organized by the Canadian Relief Fund for Chernobyl Victims in Belarus (CRFCVB), la Maison du Citoyen, Hull, Canada
 2003 International Exhibition «Alberobello Arte editione 2003», Alberobello, Italy
 2003 3rd International Exhibition of Arts, Sartrouville, France
 2004 4th International Exhibition of Arts, Sartrouville, France
 2006 5th International Exhibition of Arts, Sartrouville, France
 2006 Belarusian Embassy in Paris, France
 2009 International Exhibition at the art gallery of the Palace of Republic in Minsk, Belarus
 2011 Exhibition “Le retour au romantisme” (“Return to Romanticism”) at The National Library of Belarus, Minsk,
 2013 International Exhibition “Welcome to Central and Eastern Europe. Beyond the cliché” at D.E.V.E. Gallery in Bruges, Belgium
 2018 Exhibition of professors of art workshops in the city of Croissy-sur-Seine, France
 2018 Exhibition of artists from the Belarusian diaspora at the Belarusian embassy in France, Paris.
 2019 Exhibition of professors of art workshops in the city of Croissy-sur-Seine, France

Open Days Artists Workshops
 2016 Open Days Artists Workshops, Croissy-sur-Seine, France
 2017 Open Days Artists Workshops, Croissy-sur-Seine, France
 2018 Open Days Artists Workshops, Croissy-sur-Seine, France
 2019 Open Days Artists Workshops, Croissy-sur-Seine, France

Book illustrations 
Irina Kotova illustrated a new English version of the  book The Conversation of St Seraphim of Sarov with N.A. Motovilov, published in London in 2010.

Presentations, reportings, documentary 
 In 2009, Irina Kotova’s creative work was presented by a French writer and publicist Christophe Levalois in his report at  National Art History Institute in Paris.
 In 2010 « TV-First » Channel of  Belteleradiocompany prepared a special newscast reporting from the opening of Irina Kotova’s exhibition at  National Art Museum of the Republic of Belarus.
 In 2010, Belteleradiocompany released a documentary Imaginary Paris (director Sergej Katier). The film was awarded the prize of the Mayor of Obninsk at the  7th International Sretenskij Orthodox Film Festival, which was held  from 17 to 22 February 2012 in four  towns of Kaluga region (Russia).

Edition 
 In 2010, Irina Kotova’s painting album Imaginary Paris translated in  three languages (French, Belarusian and Russian) was  prepared and published in common with a French writer Christophe Levalois and with the assistance of Ministry of Cultural Affairs of Belarus, Belarusian Embassy in Paris, France, Embassy of France in Belarus and the Belarusian Union of Artists. Minsk, 2010 .

References

External links 
 
 The interview published in the Narodnaja Volya, January 11, 2011
 The interview published in the Belarus Segodnya, January 12, 2011

Belarusian painters
Artists from Minsk
1976 births
Living people
Belarusian women artists
20th-century Belarusian artists
21st-century Belarusian artists
20th-century Belarusian painters
21st-century Belarusian painters
20th-century women artists
21st-century women artists
Belarusian State Academy of Arts alumni